Through the Trees is the third full-length album released by The Handsome Family. It was released 1998 by Carrot Top Records (North America) / Loose Music (Europe).

Through the Trees was nominated by Mojo readers as one of the most important Americana CDs of the 1990s.

Track listing
All music by Brett Sparks; all lyrics by Rennie Sparks, except as noted.

Personnel
 Brett & Rennie Sparks - voice, guitar, banjo, bass, dobro, melodica, autoharp, drum machine, piano, etc. except as follows
 Jeff Tweedy - backing vocals, tracks 3, 4, 5, 7; guitar, end of track 4; rhythm guitar, track 5
 Dave Trumfio - additional percussion; bass on "Stalled"
 Jessica Billey - violin on "Down In The Ground"
 Dave Smith and Dave Winer of The Baltimores -  horns on "My Ghost"
 Brad Miller - band photo

References

External links
The Handsome Family official website

1998 albums
The Handsome Family albums
Carrot Top Records albums
Loose Music albums